Jonsered Manor is a 19th centaury manor located in Jonsered, Partille kommun, Sweden. The mansion's garden has won the 2015 Elmia Inspira award for 'Sweden's most inspiring park'. Jonsered Manor is now being managed by University of Gothenburg as its cultural and intellectual centre. The centre now hosts events and academic conferences.

References

University of Gothenburg